Fabric 31 is a DJ mix compilation album by Marco Carola, as part of the Fabric Mix Series.

Track listing
  Matt John - Io
  Erikotanabe - Waj Rebbag (Eclat & Prudo - Alfa Romero Remix)
  Chris Carrier - Sure Shot
  Marek Bois - You Got Good Ash (Gabriel Ananda Remix)
  Fusiphorm - I Am...You! (Someone Else Remix)
  Timo Anttila - Nakuta
  Barem - Cilindro
  Mathias Kaden - Snowman
  Paco Osuna - Cretine
  Fraktion - Acidrop
  Marc Houle - Kicker
  Audio Werner - Onandon
  Dolly La Parton - Whenever
  Microfunk AKA 2000 And One and Dave Ellesmere - Pecan
  Detail - Change
  Dario Zenker - Newbe (Heartthrob’s Are U Gay Remix)
  Ernie - Escarabajos
  Alex Smoke - Plunder

References

External links
Fabric: Fabric 31

Fabric (club) albums
2006 compilation albums